Bronwen Dickey (born, May 17, 1981) is an American author, journalist, and lecturer.

Education
Bronwen Dickey obtained an MFA in Non-fiction Writing from Columbia University in 2009.

Authorship
Dickey is a contributing editor at The Oxford American and the author of Pit Bull: The Battle over an American Icon.  Her book attempted to show that negative views about the breed have often been shaped by misunderstandings of pit bulls and their history. This led to her unwittingly becoming a "heroine" for the pro-pit bull community and the target of threats and harassment from those who see her as an "apologist" for a so-called "vicious animal."

She was a finalist for the 2017 National Magazine Award in feature writing and won a Lowell Thomas Award in the category "Magazine Article on U.S./Canada Travel".

Academia
Dickey's a Visiting Lecturer on Journalism and Public Policy in Duke University.

Personal life
She lives in North Carolina. She's the youngest child of the late poet and novelist James Dickey.

References

External links

1981 births
Writers from Columbia, South Carolina
Living people
American magazine editors
American women non-fiction writers
Women magazine editors
Duke University faculty
Columbia University School of the Arts alumni
American women academics
21st-century American women